H. hastata may refer to:
 Hakea hastata, a shrub species in the genus Hakea
 Huara hastata, Forster & Wilton, 1973, a spider species in the genus Huara found in New Zealand
 Huperzia hastata, a species of plant endemic to Ecuador

Synonyms 
 Hasteola hastata, a synonym for Parasenecio hastatus, a plant species

See also 
 Hastata (disambiguation)